Pahinui is a crater on Mercury. Its name was adopted by the International Astronomical Union in 2016, after the Hawaiian musician, Charles Phillip Kahahawai "Gabby" Pahinui.

There is a rimless, irregular depression in the center of Pahinui, making it a pit-floor crater.  Such a feature may have resulted from the collapse of a magma chamber underlying the central part of the crater.

References

Impact craters on Mercury